Massachusetts House of Representatives' 3rd Norfolk district in the United States is one of 160 legislative districts included in the lower house of the Massachusetts General Court. It covers part of Norfolk County. Democrat Ron Mariano of Quincy has represented the district since 1991.

Locales represented
The district includes the following localities:
 part of Holbrook
 part of Quincy
 part of Weymouth

The current district geographic boundary overlaps with those of the Massachusetts Senate's Norfolk and Plymouth district and Plymouth and Norfolk district.

Former locale
The district previously covered part of Roxbury, circa 1872.

Representatives
 Thomas Parsons, circa 1858-1859 
 Ferdinand Adolphus Wyman, circa 1888 
 Russell T. Bates, circa 1920 
 Allan R. McDonald, circa 1920 
 John R. Nelson, circa 1920 
 John L. Gallant, circa 1951 
 Raymond P. Palmer, circa 1951 
 Albert E. Roberts, circa 1951 
 Joseph E. Brett, circa 1975 
 Michael W. Morrissey
 Robert A. Cerasoli
 Ronald Mariano, 1991-current

See also
 List of Massachusetts House of Representatives elections
 Other Norfolk County districts of the Massachusetts House of Representatives: 1st, 2nd,  4th, 5th, 6th, 7th, 8th, 9th, 10th, 11th, 12th, 13th, 14th, 15th
 List of Massachusetts General Courts
 List of former districts of the Massachusetts House of Representatives

References

External links
 Ballotpedia
  (State House district information based on U.S. Census Bureau's American Community Survey).

House
Government of Norfolk County, Massachusetts